is a vertically scrolling shooter created by Sega and released in arcades in 1987. Home computer versions followed.

Gameplay

The player, piloting an airplane fighter, begins with a single gun (as with most scrolling shooters) and can power up by collecting power ups dropped by certain colored enemies. The power ups can add a ship to the fighter's left and right sides and increase shot power and range. They can also drop bombs, which can wipe out all weak enemies on screen and do massive damage to stronger enemies.

Reception

In Japan, Game Machine listed Sonic Boom on their February 1, 1988 issue as being the third most-successful table arcade unit of the month.

The home ports of Sonic Boom received mixed to negative reviews.

Crash had said that it plays very much like Flying Shark and "doesn't offer anything that hasn't already been seen".

The Games Machine''' rated the Atari ST version 79%, the Amiga version 78%, the ZX Spectrum version 76%, the Amstrad CPC version 37% and the Commodore 64 version 64%.Zzap!64 rated the Commodore 64 version 52% and the Amiga version 58%.Amiga Action'' rated the Amiga version 49%.

References

1987 video games
Arcade video games
Amiga games
Amstrad CPC games
Atari ST games
Commodore 64 games
ZX Spectrum games
Sega arcade games
Sega video games
Activision games
Japanese games
Vertically scrolling shooters
Aircraft carriers in fiction
Video games developed in Japan